Antoine Léandre Sardou (1803–1894) was a French philologist.

1803 births
1894 deaths
French philologists